Bachelor Girls is a 2016 English-language Indian documentary, exposing the stigma faced by the single woman in the modern Indian city of Mumbai.

.  It is directed by filmmaker Shikha Makan. She is a psychology graduate from Delhi University, former radio jockey and theatre artist.

Selections 
 Official Selection 35th CAAM Fest 2017, (San Francisco International Asian American Film Festival)
 Official Selection 40th Asian American International Film Festival, New York, 2017
 Official Selection 14th Indian Film Festival, Stuttgart, Germany, 2017
 Vancouver International South Asian Film Festival, 2016
 International Madurai Film Festival, 2016
 Chennai International Documentary & Short Film Festival, curated screening by WMF, 2017
 Nazariya, International Women Film Festival, Hyderabad

References 

 https://aaiff.org/2017/films/bachelor-girls/
 http://www.indisches-filmfestival.de/files/5314/9794/2902/PM_IFFS17_engl.pdf

Indian documentary films
Women's rights in India
2016 films
2016 documentary films